Hysteria is a 1965 British murder mystery film directed by Freddie Francis, produced by Hammer Films and released by Metro-Goldwyn-Mayer. The film stars Robert Webber and Anthony Newlands.

Plot
American Chris Smith wakes up in an English hospital unable to remember anything of his life before a recent car accident.

Four months later, he has recovered physically but has still not retrieved his memory. His amnesia is being treated by Dr. Keller, a psychiatrist, who tells him that his bills are being paid by an anonymous benefactor, who has made an apartment available to him. Dr. Keller warns him that he might suffer hallucinations.

The only other link to his past is a photograph torn from a newspaper. Chris has fallen in love with Gina, his nurse.

Upon release from the hospital, Chris moves into a flat and hires Hemmings, a private investigator. Chris visits the photographer of the photo, who tells him that the subject is dead, the victim of a shower murder.

In his flat, Chris hears strange voices coming from next door: a couple arguing. He keeps seeing a woman around town, from time to time, who reminds him of the woman in the photo, and he discovers a bloody knife in his shower.

Chris receives a late night visit from Denise, who claims to be the widow of the man responsible for the automobile accident that caused Chris to lose his memory. Denise bears a remarkable resemblance to the woman in the photograph.

Denise plies Chris with drugs, and after one such episode, he discovers in his shower the body of a murdered woman, which later disappears.

Assisted by Hemmings, Chris tricks Denise and Keller into admitting that they are the murderers, having planned to frame him for the crime, and that the victim is the physician's wife. Chris is reunited with Gina.

Cast
 Robert Webber as Chris Smith
 Anthony Newlands as Dr. Keller
 Jennifer Jayne as Gina McConnell
 Maurice Denham as Hemmings
 Lelia Goldoni as Denise James
 Peter Woodthorpe as Marcus Allan
 Sandra Boize as English Girl
 Sue Lloyd as French Girl
 John Arnatt as Mr. James
 Marianne Stone as Miss Grogan, Marcus Allan's Secretary
 Irene Richmond as Mrs. Keller
 Kiwi Kingston as French Girl's Husband

Reception
The film performed disappointingly at the box office.

James Carreras of Hammer announced it had a film titled Brainstorm to follow Hysteria but this appears to have not been made.

DVD
Hysteria was released to DVD by Warner Home Video on 2 November 2011 via the Warner Archive DVD-on-demand service as a Region 0 widescreen DVD.

References

External links

1965 films
1960s thriller films
British mystery thriller films
Films about amnesia
Films directed by Freddie Francis
Hammer Film Productions films
Films with screenplays by Jimmy Sangster
Films produced by Jimmy Sangster
Films shot at MGM-British Studios
1960s English-language films
1960s British films